Paso de los Toros (Bulls' Pass)  is a city of the Tacuarembó Department in Uruguay.

History
The Midland Uruguay Railway began operation in 1889 with a line that ran between Paso de los Toros and Salto. On 17 July 1903, the group of houses of the area known as Paso de los Toros was declared a "Pueblo" (village) named "Santa Isabel" and became head of the judicial section of the same name. On 27 November 1929 it was renamed to "Paso de los Toros" and its status was elevated to "Villa" (town) by the Act of Ley Nº 8.523. On 1 July 1953, its status was further elevated to "Ciudad" (city) by the Act of Ley Nº 11.952.

Population 
In 2011, Paso de los Toros had a population of 12,985, which makes it the second largest city in the department, after the capital city of Tacuarembó.
 
Source: Instituto Nacional de Estadística de Uruguay

Geography

Climate

Places of worship
 St. Elizabeth Parish Church (Roman Catholic)
 La Iglesia de Jesucristo de los Santos de los Últimos Días

Soft drink
In Uruguay, Pepsi manufactures a Paso de los Toros soft drink named after the city.

Noted local people

 Fabián O'Neill: football player
 Rider O'Neil: football player
 Mario Benedetti: writer
 Nelson Acosta: football manager
 Víctor Púa: football manager
 Waldemar Rial: basketball player

References

External links
INE map of Paso de los Toros

 
Populated places in the Tacuarembó Department